Amr Shabana (born 20 July 1979 in Cairo) is a former professional squash player from Egypt. He won the World Open in 2003, 2005, 2007 and 2009, and reached the World No. 1 ranking in 2006.

He represented the winning Egyptian team in the 1999 Men's World Team Squash Championships held in Cairo and the 2009 Men's World Team Squash Championships held in Denmark. Shabana's accomplishments in professional squash lead many to regard him as one of the greatest players of all time.

Career overview
The talented left-hander from Cairo first showed his promise when he was the runner-up (to compatriot Ahmed Faizy) in the British Under-14 Open in January 1993. Four years later he reached the final of the British Under-19 Open, where he again lost to Faizy.

A PSA member since 1995, Amr claimed his first Tour title with the help of Bryan "Griffin" Knight in July 1999, winning the Puebla Open in Mexico. Seven days later he grabbed his second, the Mexico Open, again by beating Australia's Craig Rowland in the final.

Amr Shabana crowned a remarkable year in 2003 when, as ninth seed, he forced his way through a star-studded field in the World Open in Pakistan. He dispatched title-holder David Palmer, the third seed, in five games in the third round. He then went on to take out Palmer's Australian teammate Anthony Ricketts in the last eight. After defeating Karim Darwish (the Egyptian No 1) in a four-game semi-final, Shabana clinched the historic title by beating Thierry Lincou in the final 15–14, 9–15, 15–11, 15–7, to become Egypt's first winner of the sport's premier title.

But after a disappointing following year, in which his only final appearance was in the British Open Squash Championship in England, losing to David Palmer in four games 10–11 (4–6), 11–7, 11–10 (3–1), 11–7, Shabana stormed back to the top of his game in 2005. Over a short period, he acquired a new coach, Ahmed Tahir; a new manager, the former Egyptian international Omar Elborolossy; and a wife, Nadjla. "All I have to worry about now is playing my matches – everything else is looked after for me now", said Shabana. And the effect was plain to see as a week after winning the Heliopolis Open in his home town Cairo, the seventh-seeded Shabana beat David Palmer  and James Willstrop, before defeating Anthony Ricketts in the final to claim the St Louis Open crown in the United States.

The next event saw the in-form Egyptian brush aside all opposition in the Hungarian Open in Budapest, winning his third title in as many weeks after beating Grégory Gaultier in the final. But the World Open in Hong Kong confirmed his renaissance beyond doubt. Seeded five, Amr crushed fourth seed Lee Beachill in the quarters, Peter Nicol in the semis, and, in his third successive straight games victory, powered past David Palmer 11–6 11–7 11–8 in the final to become the first player since the heyday of the Khans to win the World Open title for the second time.

The new year brought continuing rewards for Shabana with victories in the Canadian Classic in January, followed by the Tournament of Champions in New York in March, and the Bermuda PSA Masters in April – bringing his PSA Tour title tally to 12, and then in April 2006, Shabana became the first Egyptian player to reach the world number 1 ranking.

In 2007, Shabana was crowned world champion for the third time in five years at the World Open in Bermuda and later in January 2009, Shabana's 33-month reign as World No. 1 was ended by his countryman Karim Darwish.

In 2014, Shabana became the oldest professional to win a World Series title by defeating Grégory Gaultier in the finals of Tournament of Champions.

On the 27th of August 2015, Shabana announced his retirement from competitive professional squash.

World Open final appearances

4 titles & 0 runner-up

Major World Series final appearances

British Open: 1 final (0 title, 1 runner-up)

Hong Kong Open: 4 finals (4 titles, 0 runner-up)

Qatar Classic: 3 final (1 title, 2 runner-up)

US Open: 4 finals (2 titles, 2 runner-up)

Career statistics

Listed below.

PSA Titles (30)
All Results for Amr Shabana in PSA World's Tour tournament

Note: (ret) = retired, min = minutes, h = hours

PSA Tour Finals (runner-up) (11)

Singles performance timeline 

To prevent confusion and double counting, information in this table is updated only once a tournament or the player's participation in the tournament has concluded.

Note: NA = Not Available

See also
 Official Men's Squash World Ranking

References

External links

 
 
 
 
 20 Questions With Amr Shabana at Squashsite.co.uk
 All About Amr Shabana at Squashsite.co.uk
 Kaleidoscope Almost Famous by Amr Shabana at Squashsite.co.uk
 Amr's Profile at El Ahram Weekly

Egyptian male squash players
1979 births
Living people
Sportspeople from Cairo